Blue Skies is a 1996 studio album by Contemporary Christian music artist Bryan Duncan.

Track listing

 "Blue Skies" (Bryan Duncan, Reed Vertelney) – 4:18
 "Turnin'" (Duncan, Dan Muckala) – 3:19
 "After This Day Is Gone" (Duncan, Larry Tagg, Sheppard Solomon, John Clifforth) – 5:17
 "One Touch Away" (Duncan, Vertelney, Jeff Pescetto, Alan Ray Scott) – 3:45
 "Dying to Meet You" (Duncan, Scott Sheriff) – 5:32
 "A Whisper Heard Around the World" (Duncan, Sheriff) – 4:25
 "No Greater Love" (Scott Cross, Peter Roberts) – 5:07
 "Tell Me Where You Are" (Duncan, Karen Manno, John Rosen) – 3:50
 "Joy Is a Singable Thing" (Duncan, James Felix) – 3:19
 "Take Another Look at Me" (Duncan, Manno, Muckala, Rosen) – 4:54
 "Dying to Meet You" (reprise) (Duncan, Sheriff) / "Take Heart" (Duncan, Vertelney) – 6:32

Personnel 

 Bryan Duncan – lead vocals 
 Alan Pasqua – keyboards, track arrangements
 Tim Pierce – guitars, track arrangements
 Jimmie Lee Sloas – bass guitar
 James Raymond – Minimoog bass
 Scott Williamson – drums
 Bob Wilson – drums, brass arrangements
 Eric Boseman – percussion
 Steve Latanation – percussion
 Kim Hutchcroft – saxophones
 David Beatty – trombone, euphonium
 Larry Hall – trumpet
 Thaddis "Kuk" Harrell – backing vocals
 Lisa Lashawn – backing vocals
 Dave Pettway – backing vocals

Production
 Dan Posthuma – producer
 Dan Garcia – associate producer, engineer
 Teresa Cactin – assistant engineer
 Brian Carney – assistant engineer
 Scott Lovelis – assistant engineer
 Greg Parker – assistant engineer
 Steve MacMillan – mixing
 Tim Gerron – mix assistant
 Krishan Sharma – mix assistant
 Hank Williams – mastering
 Christy Coxe – art direction
 Kerosene Halo – design
 Robert Sebree – photography
 Michelle Thompson – styling
 Kara Yoshimoto – hair, make-up

Studios
 Recorded at Seventeen Grand Studio, Nashville, Tennessee; A to Z Studios, San Dimas, California; Terra Nova Studios, Pasadena, California; Granite Studio and LA F/X, Hollywood, California.
 Mixed at Westlake Studios, Los Angeles, California, and A&M Studios, Hollywood, California.
 Mastered at MasterMix, Nashville, Tennessee.

References 

Bryan Duncan albums
1996 albums